Rodrigo Prieto Aubert (born 8 February 1983 in Guadalajara, Jalisco) is a former Mexican footballer who last played for Venados as a striker in the Ascenso MX.

Club career
Prieto previously played for Morelia and Cruz Azul in the Mexican Primera División; he also competed in second division for Puebla F.C. and Mérida F.C.

References

External links
 
 

1983 births
Living people
Mexican people of French descent
Atlético Morelia players
Cruz Azul footballers
Caracas FC players
Dorados de Sinaloa footballers
Club Puebla players
Club Necaxa footballers
Mexican expatriate footballers
Mexican footballers
Expatriate footballers in Venezuela
Toros Neza footballers
FC Juárez footballers
Club Atlético Zacatepec players
Footballers from Guadalajara, Jalisco
Association football forwards